Noel Slevin is an Irish journalist and columnist working in Letterkenny, County Donegal. He currently writes "Slevin on Sunday" for local newspaper Donegal on Sunday as well as contributing to the Donegal Democrat. He has also contributed to news reports for national radio and television broadcaster Raidió Teilifís Éireann (RTÉ).

He contributed some of his jokes to the book "Die Laughing" by George Korankye.

References

External links
 Donegal Democrat
 Noel Slevin in Donegal Times
 News, comment and ramblings from the newsroom of the Derry Journal - Derry Journal ed
  Noel Slevin, of the Donegal Democrat, explains the tragic events near Ballybofey, Co Donegal - Noel on RTÉ.ie

1954 births
Living people
Irish columnists
Irish journalists
People from Letterkenny